The Never Ending Tour is the popular name for Bob Dylan's endless touring schedule since June 7, 1988.

Tour
The Never Ending Tour 2002 started in Florida, where Dylan had not performed since September 1999. The tour continued through the southern United States.

The tour then moved on to Europe where Dylan played twenty seven cities in twelve countries including nine concerts in Germany and seven in England.

After performing Europe Dylan returned to North America performing in Canada and the United States. During this leg of the tour Dylan returned to the Newport Folk Festival. This was the first time he performed at the festival since the controversial performance there in July 1965.

After completing his US summer tour, Dylan performed a round tour of the United States starting in Seattle, Washington, on October 4 and coming to an end in Fairfax, Virginia, on November 22. It was after this last performance that Charlie Sexton left Bob Dylan's band. He returned to Dylan's band line-up in Summer 2009.

Tour dates

Festivals and other miscellaneous performances

<small>
This concert was a part of "Houston Livestock Show and Rodeo".
This concert was a part of "Newport Folk Festival".
This concert was a part of "Harley-Davidson, 100th Anniversary".
This concert was a part of "All For The Sea Annual Benefit Concert".
This concert was a part of "Janus Jazz Festival".
Dylan performed two shows that evening.
This concert was a part of "Arizona State Fair".

Box office score data

References

External links

BobLinks – Comprehensive log of concerts and set lists
Bjorner's Still on the Road – Information on recording sessions and performances

Bob Dylan concert tours
2002 concert tours